Clint Brian Bolton (born 22 August 1975) is an Australian former goalkeeper. He was one of the most experienced goalkeepers in the history of the National Soccer League, which preceded the A-League. He played over 300 games for Brisbane Strikers, Sydney Olympic FC and Parramatta Power, and won two A-League championships with Sydney FC.

Club career

Brisbane Strikers
Clint Bolton began his career at the Brisbane Strikers in 1993 signing for the club after spending a year at the Australian Institute of Sport. He spent seven seasons at the club making 178 appearances for the Brisbane Strikers, keeping 51 clean sheets. He also won the National Soccer League final in 1997 with the club. In 2000, Bolton signed for Sydney Olympic FC.

Sydney Olympic FC
Sydney Olympic FC was Clint Bolton's second club and he spent three seasons at the club making 95 appearances for the club making 32 clean sheets. In the 2001/02 National Soccer League competition, Sydney Olympic FC won the NSL title. The club also made it to the NSL final in the 2002/03 season, but were defeated by Perth Glory in the final. After three seasons at the club, Bolton signed for the Parramatta Power.

Parramatta Power
Parramatta signed Bolton in 2003 after Bolton had spent the previous three seasons at Sydney Olympic FC. He played one season for the club making 27 appearances and keeping 11 clean sheets. In the final National Soccer League competition in 2003/04, Parramatta made it to the NSL Grand Final against the Perth Glory. The winner would be the final winner of the National Soccer League competition which had been running since 1977. Clint Bolton was making his 300th NSL appearance and it was to be his last. The Parramatta Power lost the game in extra-time 1–0 to Perth Glory in the final game of the season and the final game of the NSL competition. After the NSL competition had folded, Bolton was looking for another club to keep his match practice and fitness. He opted to sign for firstly Fraser Park FC where he made 10 appearances and afterwards he signed for APIA Leichhardt. He then went on to sign for Sydney FC for the inaugural A-League season.

Sydney FC

Clint Bolton signed for Sydney FC from APIA Leichhardt for the inaugural A-League season. He made his Sydney FC league debut against the Melbourne Victory on 28 August 2005. He helped his side to the inaugural Hyundai A-League Grand Final against the Central Coast Mariners in which Sydney FC won by one goal to nil. He played every game throughout the season in the league (24 games) for Sydney FC making 5 clean sheets. He was voted as Sydney FC player of the year for the 2005–06 season ahead of the other nominees Dwight Yorke, Alvin Ceccoli and David Carney. On receiving the honour Bolton stated  "It is always an honour to win an award like this, especially when it is voted on by your team mates. It has been a great year for Sydney FC, winning the Championships and doing well at the Club World Championships, and to receive this award is very flattering. We have all worked incredibly hard over the last 13 months since we started training and to be singled out amongst the players we have is special."  On 1 January 2007 he achieved a record 5 consecutive clean sheets, beating Central Coast Stopper Danny Vukovic's record of 4. He again played every match of the A-League season in 2006–07 for Sydney, and is currently the club's highest capped player. Bolton was only the 2nd player to reach 100 competitive games for the Sky Blues when he played the first Pre-Season match against Queensland Roar. Clinton received a standing ovation and a guard of honour as he ran out. In a statement given after the 2–1 victory he said he was extremely happy to have reached the milestone and hopes he can continue his career with Sydney for another 3–5 years.

Melbourne Heart
On 16 February 2010, it was announced that Bolton had signed for the new A-League club Melbourne Heart as the team's inaugural goalkeeper. He played in every minute of the Heart's thirty matches in its first season in the A-League, and earned seven clean sheets along the way. He was accoladed for his efforts at the end of the season by receiving the club's 'player of the year' award.

As a result of the Heart finishing second-to-last on the A-League ladder, their worst finish in an A-League season, Bolton, along with teammates Simon Colosimo, Matt Thompson and Fred, were released by the Heart at the conclusion of the 2012–13 A-League season. Bolton joined Melbourne Heart as Strategic Projects Manager in July 2013.

Club career statistics 

Source: worldfootball.net, football-lineups.com
A.  Includes the Pre-Season Challenge Cup (2005–2008) and the FFA Cup.

B.  For the purposes of this table, "Asia" also includes the Oceania Club Championship (OFC).

C.  "Other" matches include OFC Club Championship Australian Qualifying Tournament, Club World Cup and the Pan-Pacific Championships

International career
Bolton was part of the Australian Under-20 squad for the 1995 FIFA World Youth Championship in Qatar. He also appeared for the Olyroos in qualifiers for the 1996 Olympic Games, but was not included in the squad for the final tournament. He made his senior international debut for Australia against Paraguay in 2000, and was a squad member when Australia won the 2000 OFC Nations Cup. He subsequently represented Australia against Tonga and Fiji in 2001, keeping clean sheets in all of his three international appearances.

On 16 August 2006, Bolton was recalled to the Socceroos side, after 20 appearances on the bench over the years, in a second-string Australian line-up for an Asian Cup qualifier against Kuwait. He kept a clean sheet and helped Australia to a 2–0 win.

National team statistics

Honours

Club
Brisbane Strikers
 NSL Championship: 1996–97
Sydney Olympic
 NSL Championship: 2001–02
Sydney FC
 A-League Championship: 2005–06, 2009–10
 A-League Premiership: 2009–10
 Oceania Club Championship: 2004–05

Country
Australia
OFC Nations Cup: 2000
OFC U-20 Championship: 1994

Individual
 A-League Goalkeeper of the Year: 2005–06
 Sydney FC Player of the Year: 2005–06
 Melbourne Heart Player of the Year: 2010–11, 2011-12
 PFA A-League Team of the Season: 2011–12
 Sydney FC Hall of Fame: 2015
 Sydney FC Team of the Decade: 2006-2015

References

External links
 Oz Football profile
 Clint Bolton Interview

1975 births
Living people
Sportspeople from Bundaberg
Australian soccer players
Australia international soccer players
Australia youth international soccer players
Brisbane Strikers FC players
Sydney Olympic FC players
Parramatta Power players
Sydney FC players
Melbourne City FC players
A-League Men players
Association football goalkeepers
National Soccer League (Australia) players
APIA Leichhardt FC players
Australian Institute of Sport soccer players
Melbourne City FC non-playing staff
Fraser Park FC players
2000 OFC Nations Cup players
2001 FIFA Confederations Cup players
Australian expatriate sportspeople in England